Details is a 2003 Swedish drama film directed by Kristian Petri about a young author and her various relationships over ten years. It was entered into the 26th Moscow International Film Festival.

Cast
Rebecka Hemse       .... 	Emma
Michael Nyqvist	.... 	Erik
Jonas Karlsson	.... 	Stefan
Pernilla August	.... 	Ann
Gunnel Fred 	.... 	Eva
Valter Skarsgård    .... 	Daniel (young)
Gustaf Skarsgård    .... 	Daniel (old)
Ingela Olsson	.... 	Actress
Leif Andrée 	.... 	Actor
Ebba Hultkvist	.... 	Rineke

References

External links

2003 films
2000s Swedish-language films
2003 drama films
Swedish drama films
Films about writers
2000s Swedish films